Brachyspiraceae is a family of Spirochaetota.

Spirochetosis of the appendix, caused by Brachyspira aalborgi or Brachyspira pilosicoli, is not associated with appendicitis.

References

Spirochaetes